Uch Power Plant is a combined cycle power plant, located in Dera Murad Jamali, Nasirabad District, Baluchistan, Pakistan. It has three GE frame 9E gas turbines, three Deltak HRSGs and one GE steam turbine which can generate an output of 560 MW. It is regarded as the best power plant in the region with an availability of 97% and above. Uch-I Power started its commercial operation in 2000. The plant is certified for compliance with ISO9001, ISO14001 and OHSAS 18001.

The plant is owned by French energy giant ENGIE.

Uch-II Power Plant
The recently completed gas thermal power generation project is to develop a 404 MW gas-fired combined cycle power plant Uch II as an expansion to the existing 596 MW Uch Power Station (“Uch I”) owned and operated by Uch Power (Private) Limited (“UPL”) in Balochistan Province, Pakistan. Prime Minister Nawaz Sharif inaugurated Uch II power plant in Dera Murad Jamali, Balochistan.

Uch II is designed to use the supply of indigenous gas in the Uch Gas Field (“UGF”). Uch I is also using the gas from UGF. The Project will be structured as a standalone Independent Power Plant and will be built on the site of Uch I, using the available vacant land within the Uch I property that was already acquired and fenced and will use some of the existing physical and management infrastructure. In addition to the infrastructure, the Project will benefit from synergies with the existing plant in the form of a shared management team as well as common utilization of O&M resources and administrative staff. Similar to the operating 586 MW Uch I plant, the Project is expected to be one of the lowest cost producers of power in the country. The Project will be established under a separate project company called Uch-II Power (Private) Limited (the “Company”). The company will be 100% owned by International Power Plc., which is headquartered in London and is one of the world's leading independent power generation companies with over 32,000 MW capacity worldwide. The total project cost is estimated at $500 million, and the proposed IFC investment is an A-loan for IFC's International Finance Corporation (World Bank Group) own account of up to $100 million.

The Uch Project site is located about 600 km north of Karachi and 42 km in the north west of Jacobabad, in the Dera Murad Jamali sub-district of Balochistan Province. Uch I is located within a boundary wall covering an area of about 260 hectares of land and using about 30% of the total area. Uch II will require about 83.5 hectares of the existing land including a residential colony.

The transmission line to evacuate power from Uch II will be developed by a separate entity called National Transmission and Dispatch Company (“NTDC”), a sub-division of WAPDA which is government owned. Based on the available information, NTDC is considering to develop (i) a 220 kV transmission line of about 125 km from Uch II to Sibi, (ii) a 220 kV transmission line of about 0.5 km for looping in and out of the existing Uch I Power Plant – Shikarpur New 220 kV S/C transmission line at Uch II Power Plant, and (iii) reconductoring of 220 kV line section, about 1 km long between Uch I Power Plant and Uch II power Plant from single rail to twin bundled rail conductor.

Gas will be supplied from Uch Gas Field about 47 km from Uch II site using an existing gas pipeline. For Uch I, UGF has existing dedicated 15 wells. For Uch II, additional 15 new gas wells will be developed by OGDCL (Oil and Gas Development Company Limited) to supply gas from UGF.

Details of the water supply arrangement for Uch II are still to be finalized. The current plan is to receive water from the nearby Pat Feeder Canal using an existing water extraction permit by a new 3 km underground water pipe to be constructed within the existing 100 m right of way and additional pumping station.

See also

 List of power stations in Pakistan

References

Natural gas-fired power stations in Pakistan
Energy in Balochistan, Pakistan
Nasirabad District